The 2008 Ohio Valley Conference men's basketball tournament took place March 4–8, 2008. The first round was hosted by the better seed in each game. The semifinals and finals took place at Nashville Municipal Auditorium in Nashville, Tennessee. Austin Peay won the tournament advanced to the NCAA tournament.

Format
The top eight eligible men's basketball teams in the Ohio Valley Conference receive a berth in the conference tournament.  After the 20 game conference season, teams are seeded by conference record.

Bracket

Sources
 Field Set for 2008 OVC Men's Basketball Tournament
 CBS Sportsline

References

Tournament
Ohio Valley Conference men's basketball tournament
Ohio Valley Conference men's basketball tournament
Ohio Valley Conference men's basketball tournament
Basketball competitions in Nashville, Tennessee
College sports tournaments in Tennessee